Marcel Elie Jean Gaillard (15 January 1927 – 1976) was a Belgian professional footballer who played in England for Tonbridge, Crystal Palace, Portsmouth, Weymouth, Yeovil Town and Dorchester Town, making a total of 80 appearances in the Football League. Gaillard was the first non-British footballer to play for Crystal Palace; he was also the first non-British player to score for them. He also played in Belgium for Olympic Charleroi. In 1960 he went to Dorchester Town as player-manager but had to retire from playing soon after due to injury, continuing to manage the side until 1964.

References

1927 births
1976 deaths
Belgian footballers
R. Olympic Charleroi Châtelet Farciennes players
Tonbridge Angels F.C. players
Crystal Palace F.C. players
Portsmouth F.C. players
Weymouth F.C. players
English Football League players
Belgian expatriate footballers
Belgian expatriate sportspeople in England
Expatriate footballers in England
Association football wingers
Sportspeople from Charleroi
Dorchester Town F.C. players
Belgian football managers
Belgian expatriate football managers
Expatriate football managers in England
Yeovil Town F.C. players
Footballers from Hainaut (province)